The Sepulveda Dam is a project of the U.S. Army Corps of Engineers designed to withhold winter flood waters along the Los Angeles River. Completed in 1941, at a cost of $6,650,561, it is located south of center in the San Fernando Valley, approximately eight miles east of the river's source in the western end of the Valley, in Los Angeles, California.

Sepulveda Dam, along with Hansen Dam located in the north San Fernando Valley, was constructed in response to the historic 1938 floods which killed 144 people. The dam's 17,300 acre ft. capacity would allow it to hold back roughly 2 1/4 inches of runoff from the 141 mi2 of catchment upstream. It was placed at what was at the time, the current edge of the city. East of the dam the river was crowded into a narrow bottom by the city's growth. One legacy of Sepulveda Dam is its flood control basin, a large and undeveloped area in the center of the Valley, used mostly for wildlife refuge and recreation. But another legacy of the 1938 Los Angeles River flood was the post-World War II channelization of all the Valley's dry washes, which along with the post-World War II rapid suburbanization left the Valley with hot, dry, concrete-lined river bottoms instead of greenbelts. Although now, in part, these are being devolved as interconnecting bike paths.
 
Behind the dam, the Sepulveda Basin is home to several large recreation areas including Woodley Park, a model aircraft field, The Japanese Garden, a wildlife refuge, a water reclamation plant, and an armory.  The Basin is kept free of urban over-building so that water can build up there during a prospective hundred-year flood.

It is an often-used location for films (such as Escape from New York), music videos (such as BTS' Kinetic Manifesto and Keedy's Save Some Love), and car commercials.

History

When the 1914 flood caused $10 million in damages to the developing basin areas, a public outcry began for action to address the recurring flooding problems. During the following year, the Los Angeles County Flood Control District was formed. Some of the early flood control efforts included smaller areas of channelization and the planning for needed reservoirs. Taxpayers approved bond issues in 1917 and 1924 to build the first major dams. However, they were not willing to provide enough funding for the much needed and substantial infrastructure downstream of these dams. After two more destructive floods in the 1930s, most notably the 1938 flood, federal assistance was requested. The Army Corps of Engineers took a lead role in channelizing the river and constructing several dams which would create flood control basins behind them. Channelization began in 1938, and by 1960, the project was completed to form the present fifty-one mile engineered waterway. Included in this work were Hansen Dam, completed in 1940 and followed by Sepulveda Dam in 1941. In 1973, Burbank Blvd was built through the Sepulveda Basin, Woodley Ave was also built in the recreation area in 1975.

For 28 years the Sepulveda Dam did its job without incident until 1969 when the Los Angeles River overflowed its banks causing millions of dollars in damage. In 1988 the Los Angeles River's banks were raised to avoid another incident. In 1994 a hundred-year flood occurred in the Los Angeles River. The dam was restored and went without incident for another 11 years until the Los Angeles River again overflowed its banks in 2005.

During the 2028 Summer Olympics, the area around the dam will host Canoe Slalom, Equestrian and Shooting.

Access
Transit users can exit the G Line at either Balboa station or Woodley station.

Sepulveda Basin Recreation Area
The  Sepulveda Basin Recreation Area is a flood control basin in Encino managed by the Los Angeles City Department of Recreation and Parks.

Woodley Park
Woodley Park is a large city park located on Woodley Avenue between Victory and Burbank Boulevards. The Leo Magnus Cricket Complex, a dog park, and group picnic areas are within the park. The park was opened in 1975.

The Japanese Garden is a  public Japanese garden located on the grounds of the Tillman Water Reclamation Plant adjacent to Woodley Park.

Lake Balboa Park
Lake Balboa Park, also known as Anthony C. Beilenson Park, is an  park and water recreation facility with boat rentals and fishing. Lake Balboa is a  lake filled with water reclaimed from the Tillman Water Reclamation Plant. It also has barbecue pits, children's play area, picnic tables, and covered picnic pavilions. There are many Flowering cherry trees (Prunus serrulata 'Pink Cloud') in the park.

The Balboa Station on the G Line is located at the north end of the park, at Balboa Boulevard.

Sepulveda Basin Wildlife Reserve
The Sepulveda Basin Wildlife Reserve is at the southeast end of the Sepulveda Flood Control Basin and Recreation Area. It has two sections, the North Reserve and South Reserve, located north and south of Burbank Boulevard.  Both have nature paths and hiking trails. Access and parking are in eastern Woodley Park near to the Tillman Water Reclamation Plant, or from Burbank Boulevard east of Woodley Avenue.

Haskell Creek flows through the nature preserve, and there are several wildlife ponds. Over 200 species of birds have been seen in the basin. Many, attracted by the water, gather here during fall and spring migrations. The Sepulveda Basin Wildlife Reserve is an ongoing habitat restoration project, with locally native California plants. Native trees include Fremont's cottonwood (Populus fremontii), Coast live oak (Quercus agrifolia ), Valley Oak (Quercus lobata), California Black Walnut (Juglans californica), and California sycamore (Platanus racemosa).

Sepulveda Dam Recreation Area Bike Path

The Sepulveda Dam Recreation Area Bike Path is a  bicycle path route looping around the recreation area. This “very popular bike path”  runs from Victory Boulevard near Interstate 405, westward to White Oak Avenue, south on White Oak to Burbank Boulevard, east on Burbank to Woodley Boulevard, and north on Woodley returning to Victory Boulevard. Public access is continuous along it. The ride features no steep or sustained hills with a maximum grade of no more than two percent.

A shorter route heads south on Balboa Boulevard, which crosses a natural stretch of the Los Angeles River that lined with native Arroyo willows, California sycamores, and other California native plants.

The bikeway “cruises around the Balboa Sports Center and several golf courses, and has several open areas with spectacular views of into the mountains to the north and east.”

The loop sections along Victory and Burbank can be frequented by joggers. The bike path can seasonally have burr-bearing weeds, which may cause flats in less durable tires. The Apollo II Model Airplane Field is visible from the path.

There is ample free parking available in the public park, sports field, and/or golf course parking lots on Burbank, Woodley and Balboa Boulevards.

”Not all of [the park’s bike paths] show up on the official city Rec and Parks map or Google maps. The bike paths connect to play areas along Lake Balboa, several bathrooms, natural areas (including a natural soft-bottom stretch of the L.A. River), and to the cross-valley Orange Line bike path.”

To get to the park from the Orange Bikeway start at Victory Boulevard and Balboa Boulevard, and head south, and then turn east on a bike way.

The Sepulveda Basin bike paths are accessible from Granada Hills via  Class III path on Woodley Ave.

Sepulveda Basin River Recreation Zone
The Sepulveda Basin River Recreation Zone extends from above Balboa Blvd to the confluence of Haskell Creek below Burbank Blvd. It is open for recreational non-motorized boating during the summer, with restricted access to some protected wildlife areas along the banks.

Other facilities
Other recreation facilities within the Sepulveda Dam Recreation Area include:
Balboa Sports Complex, with a children's play area, community room, indoor gym; and lighted: baseball diamonds, basketball courts, soccer fields, football field, handball courts, tennis courts, and volleyball courts.
Hjelte Sports Center, with softball diamonds.
Sherman Oaks Castle Park, with miniature golf, an arcade, and batting cages.
Encino Golf Course, Balboa Golf Course, and Woodley Lakes Golf Course (all 18-hole).
Apollo XI  Field for model airplanes.

See also
 Los Encinos State Historic Park
 List of parks in Los Angeles

References

External links 
 Friends of the Sepulveda Basin, organization website
 Friends of Lake Balboa, organization website
 SAN FERNANDO VALLEY BIKE ROUTE

Dams in Los Angeles County, California
Los Angeles River
Buildings and structures in the San Fernando Valley
United States Army Corps of Engineers dams
Parks in the San Fernando Valley
Parks in Los Angeles
Encino, Los Angeles
Lake Balboa, Los Angeles
Van Nuys, Los Angeles
Dams completed in 1941
1941 establishments in California
Geography of the San Fernando Valley
Landmarks in Los Angeles
20th century in Los Angeles
Moderne architecture in California
PWA Moderne architecture in California
Venues of the 2028 Summer Olympics
Olympic canoeing venues
Olympic kayaking venues
Olympic equestrian venues
Olympic shooting venues